Jamie Lee Lawson (born October 2, 1965) is a former professional American football fullback in the National Football League for the Tampa Bay Buccaneers from 1989–1990 and New England Patriots in 1990.  He played college football at Nicholls State University and was drafted in the fifth round of the 1989 NFL Draft.

References

External links 
Nicholls Colonels bio
NFL bio

1965 births
Living people
Players of American football from New Orleans
American football fullbacks
Tampa Bay Buccaneers players
New England Patriots players
Nicholls Colonels football players